The 2013 IAAF World Challenge was the fourth edition of the annual, global circuit of one-day track and field competitions organized by the International Association of Athletics Federations (IAAF). The series featured a total of fifteen meetings – one more than the previous year as the IAAF World Challenge Dakar and IAAF World Challenge Beijing meetings were added to the schedule while the Colorful Daegu Championships Meeting was dropped.

Schedule

References

External links
Official website

2013
World Challenge Meetings